Richard Keane was an Australian politician.

Richard Keane may also refer to:
Richard J. Keane (1933-2008), politician from Buffalo, New York
Sir Richard Keane, 2nd Baronet (1780–1855) of the Keane baronets, MP for County Waterford
Sir Richard Francis Keane, 4th Baronet (1845–1892) of the Keane baronets
Sir Richard Michael Keane, 6th Baronet (1909–2010) of the Keane baronets

See also
Richard Keen, Baron Keen of Elie (born 1954), Scottish lawyer and politician
Richard Keene (disambiguation)